Spa, formerly Spa 73, is a new-age, ambient and instrumental music channel on Sirius Satellite Radio channel 68 (previously 73), XM Satellite Radio channel 68 (previously 72, where it replaced Audio Visions, which was XM 77) and on DISH Network channel 6068.  Until February 9, 2010, it was on DirecTV channel 856.

During the 2011 Holiday Season (Tuesday 12/20/11 at 3am ET until Thursday 12/29/11 at 3am ET), Spa was replaced by Radio Hanukkah.

Core artists
Peter Kater
Steven Halpern
Brian Eno
Paul Winter
Tangerine Dream
Mark Isham
Will Ackerman
David Arkenstone
Kitaro
Enya

See also
 List of Sirius Satellite Radio stations

References

External links
 SiriusXM Spa 68
 Dish Network Official Website

Sirius Satellite Radio channels
Sirius XM Radio channels